Elen Levon (born 13 July 1994, in Ukraine) is a Ukrainian-Australian singer, actress and dancer.

Early life
Elen Levon was born on 13 July 1994 in Ukraine and moved to Sydney, Australia with her family shortly after she was born. She started ballet classes and learning other genres of dance aged three.  Her mother was in the fashion industry, so Levon modeled and walked the catwalk at her mother's and friends' fashion shows. At the age of six, Levon found out she could sing and decided it was something she wanted to do for the rest of her life. She joined a performing arts school where she could further her skills, which led to her training in all styles of dance including ballet, dance, musical theatre, singing and acting.

Career
Levon received her first management deal at the age of 13. In 2008, she was selected to be in the Australian pop group Panjo 5, through the reality television series, Airtime, which was screened on Foxtel's Nickelodeon channel. Together, they released two singles. The group later disbanded in November 2009.

During the first half of 2011, Levon was signed to Ministry of Sound as a solo artist. She played her first solo show at Australia's biggest urban music festival, Supafest, and toured with the likes of 50 Cent, G-Unit and Lil' Kim for the Winterbeatz festival. Her debut solo single, "Naughty", was released on 30 September 2011. The single peaked at number 60 on the Australian ARIA Singles Chart. It was featured in Fox8's promotional advertisement for the American television show Gossip Girl.

Levon has now released successful singles with Ministry of Sound and has been successful in Europe, especially Italy.

Influences
Levon finds music inspiration from all genres of music but as a young girl looked up to the big superstar performers such as Madonna and Michael Jackson: "I used to watch Madonna and Michael Jackson on TV and say to myself, 'I want to do that one day.'"

Discography

Featured singles

Awards and nominations

APRA Awards
The APRA Awards are presented annually from 1982 by the Australasian Performing Right Association (APRA), "honouring composers and songwriters". They commenced in 1982.

! 
|-
| 2013 
| "Like a Girl in Love" (Jamie Appleby, Melinda Appleby)
| Dance Work of the Year
| 
| 
|-

References

Living people
Actresses from Sydney
Australian child singers
Australian female dancers
Australian contemporary R&B singers
Musicians from Sydney
Ukrainian emigrants to Australia
1994 births
Levon, Elen
21st-century Australian singers
21st-century Australian women singers